Johnnie Darnell Barnes (born July 21, 1968) is a retired American football player who played four seasons in the National Football League.

Barnes attended Hampton University in Hampton, Virginia. He was selected in the ninth round of the 1992 NFL Draft by the San Diego Chargers, for whom he played three seasons. He then spent one season with the Pittsburgh Steelers. Following his NFL career, Barnes played for the Amsterdam Admirals of NFL Europe.

External links
NFL player profile
Pro Football Reference profile

1968 births
African-American players of American football
American football wide receivers
Amsterdam Admirals players
Hampton Pirates football players
Living people
Sportspeople from Suffolk, Virginia
Pittsburgh Steelers players
San Diego Chargers players
21st-century African-American people
20th-century African-American sportspeople